Bageshwariis a village and Village Development Committee in Bhaktapur District in the Bagmati Zone of central Nepal. At the time of the 2011 Nepal census it had a population of 5,385 with 1,137 houses. There were 2,609 males and 2,776 females at the time of census.

References

Populated places in Bhaktapur District